Mustafa Kučuković (born 5 November 1986) is a German former professional footballer who played as a forward.

Club career
Kučuković started his professional career at Hamburger SV in September 2004 and made his Bundesliga debut as a second-half substitute in the club's away match against VfB Stuttgart on 11 September 2004. With an age of 17 years, 10 months and 6 days he was the youngest player who has ever played for Hamburger SV in Bundesliga then. Prior to his professional debut, he spent one season playing for VfL Bochum's amateur squad and was signed by HSV's amateur squad in July 2004. Between 2004 and 2006, he played regularly for HSV's amateurs in the Regionalliga Nord and only occasionally appeared for the club's professional squad in the Bundesliga, making 14 appearances and scoring one goal in two seasons. His first and so far only Bundesliga goal was the 1–1 equaliser that secured one point for HSV in an away match against Werder Bremen on 18 December 2005. He scored the goal only two minutes after entering the match as a substitute. Playing for HSV's amateur squad in the Regionalliga Nord, he made 40 appearances and scored 22 goals in two seasons. In the 2005–06 season, he also made three appearances for HSV in the UEFA Cup.

In August 2006, HSV loaned him to 2. Bundesliga side SpVgg Greuther Fürth for one season, until June 2007. He made his debut for the club in the Second Bundesliga on 27 August 2006 in their 3–1 defeat to Hansa Rostock at home, playing as a second-half substitute. After his return to Hamburg Kučuković was sold to another 2. Bundesliga side, 1860 Munich. after a year he left Munich. He joined on 30 January 2009 French club Grenoble Foot 38. On 31 March 2010, Grenoble Foot 38 released the German forward by mutual consent.

On 17 September 2010, he signed with SønderjyskE in the Danish Superliga. On 8 June 2011, he signed a contract with Energie Cottbus, but on 31 January 2012 he moved to the Cypriot club Olympiakos Nicosia.

On 12 July 2013, he joined Hansa Rostock on a two-year contract after having been sidelined for one year due to injuries.

International career
Kučuković has played for Germany at the U-19, U-20 and U-21 level.

Career statistics

References

1986 births
Living people
Bosnia and Herzegovina emigrants to Germany
German footballers
German expatriate footballers
German people of Bosnia and Herzegovina descent
Association football forwards
Hamburger SV players
Hamburger SV II players
SpVgg Greuther Fürth players
TSV 1860 Munich players
Grenoble Foot 38 players
SønderjyskE Fodbold players
FC Energie Cottbus players
Olympiakos Nicosia players
Germany under-21 international footballers
Germany youth international footballers
Bundesliga players
2. Bundesliga players
Ligue 1 players
Danish Superliga players
Cypriot First Division players
Naturalized citizens of Germany
People from Novi Grad, Bosnia and Herzegovina
Expatriate footballers in France
Expatriate men's footballers in Denmark
Expatriate footballers in Cyprus
3. Liga players
Lüneburger SK Hansa players